Kiryathil Nair or Kiriyath Nair is a martial nobility caste belonging to the Kshatriya varṇa, which forms one of the highest-ranking subcastes of the Nair community along with the Samantha Kshatriyas with whom they share a close history. They constituted the ruling elites (Naduvazhi) and feudal aristocrats (Jenmimar) in the regions of Malabar and Cochin in present-day Kerala, India, and have traditionally lived in ancestral homes known as Tharavads.  As the pinnacle of the Nair hierarchy, the Samanthan and Kiryathil Nairs were second only to the Namboodiri Brahmins in the social status system of Kerala, and outranked even the priestly Ambalavasis.

In medieval Kerala, all of the kings belonged to extensions of the Samanthan and Kiryathil Nair castes, including the Zamorins of Calicut who were from the Eradi subgroup of the Samantan Nair subcaste, the Kollengode and Sekharivarma Rajas of Palakkad who were from the Samantan Menon subcaste, the kings of Travancore, including Marthanda Varma, who were from the Samantan Nair subcaste, as well as the Koratty Kaimals and Kodassery Karthas of the Cochin royal family who were from the Kiryathil Nair subcaste. Historians have also stated that, "The whole of the Kings of Malabar belong to the same great body, and are homogeneous with the mass of the people called as Nairs."
        

 
The Kiryathil Nairs were the original descendants of the Nāgas who, according to the legendary Brahmanical text Keralolpathi, migrated to Kerala from the North as serpent-worshippers and asserted their supremacy before the arrival of the Namboodiris, and therefore were historically given status and privileges that were not extended to other Nairs. In the words of the British anthropologist Edgar Thurston CIE, "The original Nairs were undoubtedly a military body, holding lands and serving as a militia." The Kiryathils, as a result of their royal and warrior lineages, claim descendance from the mythical Nagavanshi Kshatriya dynasty.

Etymology

The term "Kiryathil" is derived from the Malayalam word Kirīṭaṁ (കിരീടം), meaning "crown". Therefore, the literal meaning of Kiryathil Nair is "The Crowned Nair." Together with Illathu Nairs and Swaroopathil Nairs, they form the top tier of the Nair hierarchy. Unlike the other two, however, who were required to serve in the households of Namboodiris and Kshatriyas respectively, Kiryathils had no such obligations and were recognized as independent feudal lords. As such, the Swaroopathi‎l Nairs, who were traditionally employed as soldiers in the armies of regional kings, formed the bulk of the military controlled by Kiryathil overlords, who themselves reported directly to the Zamorin, the hereditary Nair king of Calicut. Additionally, Kiryathils were also the only Nair division whose members were allowed to wear bracelets on both arms (a symbol of aristocracy), and they are therefore considered superior to both the Illathu and Swaroopathil subcastes.

Relation with Namboodiri Brahmins 

Some families among the Kiryathil Nairs trace their ancestral roots to Namboodiri Brahmin households due to the earlier prevalence of the marriage tradition known as Sambandam, which was practiced between the Namboodiri, Samantha Kshatriya, Nair and Ambalavasi castes. These families belong to aristocratic tharavads known as Illams, which were ancestral homes associated with prestige, power and wealth in medieval Kerala.

Relation with Samantha Kshatriyas

The caste boundary between Kiryathil Nair and Samantha Kshatriya is very minor and therefore many families among the Kiryathils, over the course of time, became recognised as Samanthan and vice versa. As anthropologist Christopher Fuller notes, all Kshatriyas of Kerala are "super-eminent Nairs." The Kiryathils served as regional rulers, lords and military chieftains for various kings of Kerala, including the Zamorin, and owned vast amounts of lands and raised soldiers.

The title of "Kaimal" (from the Malayalam word Kai - "കൈ," meaning "hand" - signifying power and authority) was awarded by the monarchs of Kerala to certain Samanthan and Kiryathil  families who were exceedingly influential, and the Kaimals were one of the highest caste of any Hindu castes in South India.

The title of "Kartha" (from the Malayalam word Karthavu - "കർത്താവ്," meaning "lord" - signifying command and dominance) was awarded to notable Nair families who had relations with the ruling class. While the Karthas were generally considered to be lower than the Kaimals in terms of seniority, both of them jointly formed the two major lineages of the Cochin royal family.

Branching of Power

The Kiryathil Nairs, due to their significance in being the direct descendants of the Nagavanshi clans who migrated to southern India, formed the "original" rank from which the two most powerful royal houses of Kerala stemmed from:

a) The Zamorins, who were originally Kiryathil Nairs whose ancestors performed the Hiranyagarbha ceremony to elevate them to the rank of Samantan Nairs. They eventually became the kings of Calicut, beginning around 1124 AD.

Kiryathil Nair ⟶ Hiranyagarbha ritual ⟶ Samantan Nairs ⟶ The Zamorin (Kings of Calicut, circa. 1124 AD)

b) The Cochin Rajas, who were originally Kiryathil Nairs whose ancestors performed the Hiranyagarbha ceremony to elevate them to the rank of Samantha Kshatriyas. They eventually became the kings of Cochin, beginning around 1100 AD.

Kiryathil Nair ⟶ Hiranyagarbha ritual ⟶ Samantha Kshatriyas ⟶ The Cochin Raja (Kings of Cochin, circa. 1100 AD)

Incidentally, the Zamorins of Calicut and the Rajas of Cochin were engaged in a feudal struggle with each other, culminating in a series of military conflicts. Notable battles include the Battle of Cochin (1504), which saw the Kingdom of Calicut suffer a devastating defeat at the hands of their Cochin opponents, who were assisted by the Portuguese Empire.

Military Conquests

Among the numerous military conquests carried out by the Samantan and Kiryathil Nairs, the most significant was their victory against Tipu Sultan, the de facto Muslim ruler of Mysore. Tipu Sultan, along with his predecessor Hyder Ali, was aware of the caste pride that Nairs held, as well as their strict adherence to the Hindu faith and military excellence on the battlefield. He therefore deprived them of their caste status, and prohibited them from carrying arms and outlawed them. When this failed to break their martial spirit, starting in 1786 AD, Tipu Sultan began the forceful conversion of Nairs into Sunni Islam, and when they resisted and refused, he tortured, humiliated and killed most of the Nair warriors. 

Historical records show that out of the 30,000 Nair warriors who were captured alive by him, only about a hundred or so survived. The Samantans and Kiryathils vowed vengeance, and marshalled the Malayali soldiers. The Samantan Nair warrior-prince Ravi Varma Raja defeated Tipu Sultan in November 1788, while the King of Travancore Dharma Raja Rama Varma sent the Travancore Nair Brigade, under the command of Raja Kesavadas, to defeat Tipu Sultan again during the Battle of Nedumkotta in early 1790. The Nairs were helped by the Maratha Empire and the Sikh Empire, all three of whom united to destroy the armies of the Muslim ruler and finally rescue the surviving Nairs by March 1792.

Varna Classification

Historically, due to the absence of the usual 4-tier Varṇa classification in South India, the Samanthan and Kiryathil Nairs were the only two castes in South India that were objectively categorized as belonging to the Kshatriya varṇa, since they both fulfill the royal, ruling, administrative, military and social requirements and duties that are associated with warrior aristocracy, as given in the Manusmriti, the legendary legal text of Hinduism.

Social Status

While some Kiryathil Nair families were regional rulers who functioned as vassal kings to the Zamorins, most were independent aristocratic feudal lords and controlled groups of soldiers known as Charnavar under their command. These soldiers usually belonged to the Purattu Charna Nair subcaste.

Currently, the Kiryathils constitute less than 4% of the total Nair population.

Caste Inheritance

Until the early 20th century, almost all Nair families, irrespective of their social standings, followed a matrilineal system of inheritance. The children of a Nair couple would inherit the caste of their mother, while the property and lands that were owned by the family would be passed down through their daughters and sisters. This form of matrilineal inheritance was known as Marumakkathayam, and resulted in Nair families holding their women in high honor. However, the Government of Kerala passed "The Joint Family System (Abolition) Act" in 1975, which abolished this practice.

Furthermore, the historic 1926 Travancore Nayar Act (signed by the Queen of Travancore Sethu Lakshmi Bayi) greatly reduced the role of women in caste inheritance, and by late 1928, the matrilineal system of caste among Nairs was completely replaced by the patrilineal system that was followed by the rest of India. For this reason, the vast majority of Nair families have switched to favoring the father's caste for his children, while only a few of them have kept the traditional method of favoring the mother's.

See also
 Kaimal
 Nambiar (Nair subcaste)
 Nayanar (Nair Subcaste)
 Pillai

References

External links
 Digital Colonial Documents (India)

Nair